Mapheus 5 was a German Aerospace Center VSB-30 sounding  rocket launched to  on 30 June 2015 from the Esrange Space Center in Sweden.

References

Space science experiments
Sounding rockets of Germany
2015 in spaceflight
2015 in Sweden